The Anuradhapura Maha Viharaya was an important mahavihara or large Buddhist monastery for Theravada Buddhism in Sri Lanka. King Devanampiya Tissa of Anuradhapura (247–207 BCE) founded it in his capital city of Anuradhapura. Monks such as Buddhaghosa (4th to 5th century CE) and Dhammapala, who wrote commentaries on the Tipitaka and texts such as the Visuddhimagga, which are central to Theravada Buddhist doctrine, established Theravada Mahaviharan orthodoxy here. Monks living at the Mahavihara were referred to as Mahaviharavasins. 

In the 5th century, the "Mahavihara" was possibly the most sophisticated university in southern or eastern Asia. Many international scholars visited and learned many disciplines under highly structured instruction.

Theravada monastic groups

Early history
Three subdivisions of Theravāda existed in Sri Lanka during much of Buddhism's early history there: Mahāvihāra, Abhayagiri vihāra, and Jetavana. Mahāvihāra was the first tradition established, whereas monks who had separated from the Mahāvihāra tradition established Abhayagiri vihāra and Jetavana vihāra. According to A.K. Warder, the Indian Mahīśāsaka sect also established itself in Sri Lanka concurrently with Theravāda, into which it was later absorbed. Northern regions of Sri Lanka also seem to have been ceded to sects from India at certain times.

According to the Mahavamsa, the Anuradhapura mahavihara was destroyed during sectarian conflicts with the monks of the Abhayagiri vihāra during the 4th century. These Mahayana monks incited Mahasena of Anuradhapura to destroy Anuradhapura vihāra. As a result of this, a later king expelled the Mahayanins from Sri Lanka.

The traditional Theravadin account provided by the Mahavamsa stands in contrast to the writings of the Chinese Buddhist monk Faxian, who journeyed to India and Sri Lanka in the early 5th century (between 399 and 414 CE). He first entered Sri Lanka around 406 CE and began writing about his experiences in detail. He recorded that the Mahavihara was not only intact, but housed 3000 monks. He also provides an account of a cremation at Mahavihara that he personally attended of a highly respected śramaṇa who attained the arhatship. Faxian also recorded the concurrent existence of the Abhayagiri Vihara, and that this monastery housed 5000 monks. In the 7th century CE, Xuanzang also describes the concurrent existence of both monasteries in Sri Lanka. Xuanzang wrote of two major divisions of Theravāda in Sri Lanka, referring to the Abhayagiri tradition as the "Mahāyāna Sthaviras," and the Mahāvihāra tradition as the "Hīnayāna Sthaviras." Xuanzang further writes, "The Mahāvihāravāsins reject the Mahāyāna and practice the Hīnayāna, while the Abhayagirivihāravāsins study both Hīnayāna and Mahāyāna teachings and propagate the Tripiṭaka."

Later history

Some scholars have held that the rulers of Sri Lanka ensured that Theravāda remained traditional, and that this characteristic contrasts with Indian Buddhism. However, before the 12th century CE, more rulers of Sri Lanka gave support and patronage to the Abhayagiri Theravādins, and travelers such as Faxian saw the Abhayagiri Theravādins as the main Buddhist tradition in Sri Lanka.

The trend of Abhayagiri Vihara being the dominant Theravāda sect changed in the 12th century CE, when the Mahāvihāra gained the political support of King Parakkamabāhu I (1153-1186 CE), and completely abolished the Abhayagiri and Jetavana Theravāda traditions. The Theravāda monks of these two traditions were then defrocked and given the choice of either returning to the laity permanently, or attempting re-ordination under the Mahāvihāra tradition as "novices". Richard Gombrich writes that many monks from the Mahāvihāra were also defrocked:

Notes

External links
 The Official Website of Anuradhapura Maha Viharaya

Buddhist temples in Anuradhapura